Namioka may refer to:

Namioka (surname), a Japanese surname
Namioka, Aomori, a former town in Minamitsugaru District, Aomori Prefecture, Japan
Namioka Station, a railway station in Aomori, Aomori Prefecture Japan